Csaba Hell (born 20 May 1970) is a former Hungarian motorcycle speedway rider who was a member of Hungary's national team.

Career details 
 Team World Championship (Speedway World Team Cup and Speedway World Cup)
 2002 - 10th place
 2003 - 11th place
 European Club Champions' Cup
 2001 - 2nd place in Group A

References

See also 
 Hungary national speedway team

1970 births
Living people
Hungarian speedway riders